Her Own Money  is a 1922 American silent comedy film directed by Joseph Henabery, starring Warner Baxter and Ethel Clayton. Based upon a play, it was originally filmed in 1914 and featured Baxter in a small part. It is unknown whether the 1922 film currently survives.

Plot
As described in a film magazine, Mildred Carr (Clayton) is a working class wife who has saved her money and marries Lew Alden (Baxter), a struggling business man. After five years of married life, a financial crisis occurs so Mildred loans her husband her savings apparently through a third party, which causes Lew to leave her when he discovers the fraud. She goes back to work and, after he regains his losses, he asks her forgiveness and they make up.

Cast
Ethel Clayton as Mildred Carr
Warner Baxter  as Lew Alden
Charles K. French as Thomas Hazelton
Clarence Burton as Harvey Beecher
Mae Busch as Flora Conroy
Jean Acker as Ruth Alden
Roscoe Karns as Jerry Woodward

References

External links

1914 films
1922 films
Silent American comedy films
Famous Players-Lasky films
American silent feature films
1914 comedy films
American black-and-white films
1922 comedy films
1910s American films
1920s American films